Kevin Dixon may refer to:

 Kevin Dixon (attorney general) (1902–1959), Irish barrister and judge
 Kevin Dixon (footballer, born 1960), English former professional footballer
 Kevin Dixon (footballer, born 1980), English former professional footballer
 Kevin Dixon (rugby league), New Zealand rugby league international